Jimmy Savile: A British Horror Story is a two-part Netflix documentary series released on April 6, 2022. It covers the life and career of the British television personality Jimmy Savile, his history of committing sexual abuse, and the scandal that occurred after his death in 2011, when numerous complaints were raised about his behaviour.

Interviewees
As well as colleagues, associates and victims of Savile, some of the public figures interviewed for the series include:

 Lynn Barber – journalist
 Ian Hislop – editor of Private Eye
 Mark Lawson – television critic
 Martin Young –  television reporter
 Meirion Jones – investigative journalist
 Roger Ordish – BBC producer of Jim'll Fix It
 Dominic Carman – journalist
 Robin Butler – Civil Servant and Private Secretary to prime minister Margaret Thatcher
 Alison Bellamy – journalist and Savile's biographer
 Selina Scott – television journalist
 Marjorie Wallace – investigative journalist and founder of the charity SANE
 Carine Minne – forensic psychotherapist.
 Andrew Neil –  newspaper editor, journalist and television interviewer

Archive footage
A number of media personalities and significant historical figures are featured in archive footage.

 Margaret Thatcher – British prime minister
 The Rolling Stones - rock band
 The Beatles – rock band
 Melvyn Bragg – novelist and television presenter
 Philip Tibenham – journalist
 Frank Muir – comedian and writer
 Desmond Llewelyn – actor
 Russell Harty – talk-show host
 Charles, Prince of Wales
 Diana, Princess of Wales
 Prince Philip, Duke of Edinburgh
 Prince Andrew, Duke of York
 Sarah, Duchess of York
 Frank Bough – television presenter
 David Icke  –  former television sports reporter, and later conspiracy theorist
 Gloria Hunniford – television presenter
 Anne Diamond – television presenter
 Nick Owen – television presenter
 Kylie Minogue – pop singer
 Michael Aspel – talk-show host
 Edwina Currie – British politician
 Michael Parkinson – talk-show host
 Harry Secombe – comedian and television presenter
 Pope John Paul II
 George Carman – barrister and later Queen's Counsel
 Ricky Gervais – comedian and actor
 Craig Charles – actor and comedian
 Louis Theroux – documentary filmmaker
 Gary Glitter (Paul Gadd) – pop star and convicted paedophile
 George Galloway – British politician
 David Cameron  – British Prime Minister

Episodes

Reception
Reviewing the programme for The Independent, Louis Chilton said, "Netflix's two-part documentary is a slick and occasionally devastating portrait of Savile's evil life, but the subject matter proves too thorny for the standard true crime treatment." 

Carol Midgley for The Times said, "... like all documentaries about this disgusting pervert, unpleasant to watch. This is not just because of the gruesome detail, such as Savile routinely sticking his fingers into girls' vaginas and promising troubled teenagers trips to the BBC studios in return for oral sex. It is also uncomfortable because, as we know, the nation lauded, hero-worshipped and indeed knighted a psychopathic paedophile." 

Writing in the Radio Times, Jane Garvey said "I was a student in the 1980s and we all 'knew' about him. There were always rumours. Some seemed faintly plausible, if unpleasant; others sounded quite outlandish and impossible, surely... In fact, they all turned out to be true. Even the outlandish stuff."

References

External links
 
 

2022 American television series debuts
2022 American television series endings
2022 British television series debuts
2022 British television series endings
2020s American documentary television series
2020s British documentary television series
British documentary television series
Documentary television series about crime
English-language Netflix original programming
Netflix original documentary television series
Jimmy Savile